Uwe Bein (born 26 September 1960) is a German former professional footballer who played as a midfielder.

Career

Although, due to his reserved nature, he was never able to gain large public fame, Bein's fans and experts call him one of the most technically gifted German midfielders of his time. In his heyday Bein was regarded as the best German player to play the deadly pass.

Bein's professional career began in 1978 with Kickers Offenbach, before he moved to 1. FC Köln, Hamburger SV and Eintracht Frankfurt. He played 300 Bundesliga games and scored 91 goals in total. He also helped Köln to the 1986 UEFA Cup Final where his goal could not prevent them losing to Real Madrid. In 1994, he moved to Japan and started playing for Urawa Red Diamonds in 1996. In 1997, he made appearances for VfB Gießen.

The biggest success in Bein's career occurred during the 1990 FIFA World Cup, where he played four of seven games before suffering from an injury. He scored one goal in the 5–1 win over the United Arab Emirates. He started all three group matches plus the quarter final against Czechoslovakia but did not play in the final.

He did not take part in the Euro 92. Lacking support from the German head coach Berti Vogts, Bein finally retired from the national team in 1993, and thus did not take part in the World Cup 1994.

In total, he played 17 international matches, with three goals to his credit.

After his playing career ended he managed for half a year Kickers Offenbach in 2005.

Career statistics

Club

International

Scores and results list Germany's goal tally first, score column indicates score after each Bein goal.

Honours
Germany
FIFA World Cup: 1990

Individual
kicker Bundesliga Team of the Season: 1989–90, 1990–91, 1991–92, 1992–93
Bundesliga top assist provider: 1990–91, 1991–92, 1992–93

References

External links

 
 
 
 

1960 births
Living people
People from Hersfeld-Rotenburg
German expatriate sportspeople in Japan
Association football midfielders
German footballers
German expatriate footballers
Kickers Offenbach players
1. FC Köln players
Hamburger SV players
Eintracht Frankfurt players
Urawa Red Diamonds players
1990 FIFA World Cup players
Germany international footballers
FIFA World Cup-winning players
Expatriate footballers in Japan
Bundesliga players
2. Bundesliga players
J1 League players
Footballers from Hesse
Sportspeople from Kassel (region)
West German footballers